Markus Hacksteiner (born November 18, 1964 in Windisch, Aargau) is a former middle distance runner from Switzerland, who represented his native country at the 1988 Summer Olympics in Seoul, South Korea. There he was eliminated in the semifinals of the 1500 metres.

He finished eighth at the 1990 European Championships, and won a silver medal in 3000 metres at the 1988 European Indoor Championships.

References

1964 births
Living people
People from Brugg District
Swiss male middle-distance runners
Athletes (track and field) at the 1988 Summer Olympics
Athletes (track and field) at the 1992 Summer Olympics
Olympic athletes of Switzerland
Sportspeople from Aargau